The 1972 Tour de Suisse was the 36th edition of the Tour de Suisse cycle race and was held from 15 June to 23 June 1972. The race started in Zürich and finished in Olten. The race was won by Louis Pfenninger of the Rokado team.

General classification

References

1972
Tour de Suisse
Tour de Suisse